Chaetopappa hersheyi is a rare perennial plant species of plant called Hershey's cliff daisy, in the sunflower family. The epithet "hersheyi" honors the plant's discoverer, Arthur LeRoy Hershey, who collected it in 1944. It was formally described by Sidney Fay Blake in 1946.

Other vernacular names have been adapted to this plant including Guadalupe least daisy and Guadalupe lazy daisy. this name emerges from the fact that these plants are found in the Guadalupe Mountains in western Texas and southeastern New Mexico. Many of the populations lie inside Guadalupe Mountains National Park and the nearby Carlsbad Caverns National Park.

Description
The stem has rigid and ascending hairs usually with 4–6 leaves on it. Composed of white ray florets and yellow disk florets, the flower heads resembles those of the common or lawn daisy, Bellis perennis, in color. They originally blossom a light bluish color, then fading to white when mature and finally drying maroon.

It is considered an herb because it lacks woody material when established. Hershey's cliff daisy is a vascular, seed and flowering plant, this implies that these plants conduct water and minerals through the plant, and produce seeds and flowers. A type of simple, dry fruit is produced from this plant called an achene.

Ecology
It is relatively abundant in the Guadalupe Mountains.

The plant grows in full sun to partial shade conditions and its blooming time is in late spring to early fall, with the most blooming during May. It attracts bees, butterflies and birds. There are no major threats to this species other than collection along trails. Most plants grow in inaccessible locations, however.

The species has a NatureServe conservation status of G3, vulnerable. This implies that it is at moderate risk of extirpation, or extinction, in its jurisdiction due to its restricted range. The plant grows around seeps.

References

External links
New Mexico Rare Plants

hersheyi
Plants described in 1946
Flora of Texas
Flora of New Mexico
Endemic flora of the United States